Sustainable Development Goal 5 (SDG 5 or Global Goal 5) concerns gender equality and is fifth of the 17 Sustainable Development Goals established by United Nations in 2015. The 17 SDGs recognize that action in one area will affect outcomes in others, and that development must balance social, economic and environmental sustainability.

SDG 5 has nine targets and 14 indicators. Six of the targets are outcome targets: ending all forms of discrimination against all women and girls everywhere; ending violence and exploitation of women and girls; eliminating harmful practices such as child, early and forced marriage and female genital mutilation; increasing value of unpaid care and promoting shared domestic responsibilities; ensuring full participation of women in leadership and decision-making; and ensuring access to universal reproductive rights and health. The three means of implementation targets are: fostering equal rights to economic resources, property ownership and financial services for women; promoting empowerment of women through technology; and adopting, strengthening policies and enforcing legislation for gender equality.

Through the pledge to "Leave No One Behind", countries have committed to fast-track progress for those furthest behind, first. SDG 5 aims to grant women and girls equal rights, opportunities to live free without discrimination including workplace discrimination or any violence. This is to achieve gender equality and empower all women and girls.

The COVID-19 pandemic has affected women as they are more vulnerable and have reduced access to treatment. Evidence shows there has been an increase in violence against women during the pandemic.

Background 
The Sustainable Development Goals are a collection of 17 global goals set by the United Nations. The broad goals are linked yet each has its own targets to achieve. The SDGs cover a broad range of social and economic development issues. These include poverty, hunger, health, education, climate change, gender equality, water supply, sanitation, energy, urbanization, environment and social justice.

Targets, indicators and progress 

The targets and indicators for SDG 5 are extensive and provide equal opportunity for females (women and girls). Targets cover a broad crosscutting gender issues including ending all forms of discrimination against all females everywhere (Target 5.1), violence and exploitation of females (Target 5.2), eliminate practices such as female genital mutilation and forced marriages (Target 5.3), increase value of unpaid care and promote shared domestic responsibilities (Target 5.4), ensure full participation of women in leadership and decision-making (Target 5.5), ensuring access to universal reproductive rights and health (Target 5.6), fostering equal rights to economic resources, property ownership and financial services for women (Target 5.7), promoting empowerment of women through technology (Target 5.8) and adopting, strengthening policies and enforcing legislation for gender equality (Target 5.9).

Indicators represent the metrics by which the world aims to track whether these targets are achieved.

Target 5.1: End discrimination against women and girls 
The first target of SDG 5 is Target 5.1: "End all forms of discrimination against all females everywhere."
This target has one indicator. Indicator 5.1.1: Whether or not legal frameworks are in place to promote, enforce and monitor equality and non-discrimination on the basis of sex.

This means the indicator works towards the legal frameworks which can be applied to promote and enforce non-discrimination on the basis of sex across various measures including hiring, equal pay, marital rape and property rights, among others.

Discrimination against women (or sexism) can be measured with a range of indicators such as early marriage, gender-based violence and women's property rights.

Child marriage has declined over the past decades . Girls from poorer families are more likely to be affected by child marriage than those from wealthier families.

The custodian agencies for Indicator 5.1.1 are UN Women and World Bank.

Target 5.2: End all violence against and exploitation of women and girls 
The full title of Target 5.2 is: "Eliminate all forms of violence against all females in the public and private spheres including trafficking, sexual and other types of exploitation."

This target has two indicators:
 Indicator 5.2.1: Proportion of ever-partnered women and girls aged 15 years and older subjected to physical, sexual or psychological violence by a current or former intimate partner in the previous 12 months, by form of violence and by age.
 Indicator 5.2.2: Proportion of women and girls aged 15 years and older subjected to sexual violence by persons other than an intimate partner in the previous 12 months, by age and place of occurrence.

Target 5.3: Eliminate forced marriages and genital mutilation 

The full title of Target 5.3 is: "Eliminate all harmful practices, such as child, early and forced marriage and female genital mutilation (FGM)". Evidence shows that there is no health benefit in the case of female genital mutilation

Eliminating harmful practices women are able to live their live full potential lives without any harm. 

There are two indicators:

 Indicator 5.3.1: Proportion of women aged 20–24 years who were married or in a union before age 15 and before age 18
 Indicator 5.3.2: Proportion of girls and women aged 15–49 years who have undergone female genital mutilation (FGM) or cutting
According to a progress report in 2020: "At least 200 million girls and women have been subjected to female genital mutilation, according to recent data from the 31 countries where the practice is concentrated. The harmful practice is becoming less common, but progress is not fast enough to meet the global target of its elimination by 2030".

Target 5.4: Value unpaid care and promote shared domestic responsibilities 
The full title of Target 5.4: "Recognise and value unpaid care and domestic work through the provision of public services, infrastructure and social protection policies and the promotion of shared responsibility within the household and the family as nationally appropriate"

This target has one Indicator: Indicator 5.4.1 is the "Proportion of time spent on unpaid domestic and care work, by sex, age and location".

Unpaid care and domestic work includes cooking and cleaning, fetching water and firewood or taking care of children and the elderly. Data from 2020 showed that "women already spend three times as many hours as men on unpaid care work at home".

Target 5.5: Ensure full participation in leadership and decision-making 
The full title of Target 5.5 is: "Ensure women's full and effective participation and equal opportunities for leadership at all levels of decision-making in political, economic and public life."

Indicators are:
 Indicator 5.5.1: Proportion of seats held by women in (a) national parliaments and (b) local government
 Indicator 5.5.2: Proportion of women in managerial positions

As of 2020, "representation by women in single or lower houses of national parliament reached 25 per cent, up slightly from 22 per cent in 2015".

Target 5.6: Universal access to reproductive rights and health 
The full title of Target 5.6 is: "Ensuring universal access to sexual and reproductive health and reproductive rights as agreed in accordance with the Program-me of Action of the International Conference on Population and Development and the Beijing Platform for Action and the outcome documents of their review conferences."

Indicators are:
 Indicator 5.6.1: Proportion of women aged 15–49 years who make their own informed decisions regarding sexual relations, contraceptive use and reproductive health care
 Indicator 5.6.2: Number of countries with laws and regulations that guarantee full and equal access to women and men aged 15 years and older to sexual and reproductive health care, information and education

Less women 15 to 49 years of age were able to "make their own decisions regarding sexual and reproductive health and rights" in Central and Western Africa compared to countries in Europe, South- Eastern Asia and Latin America and the Caribbean.

Target 5.7: Equal rights to economic resources, property ownership and financial services 
The full title of Target 5.7 is: "Undertake reforms to give women equal rights to economic resources, as well as access to ownership and control over land and other forms of property, financial services, inheritance and natural resources, in accordance with national laws."

The two indicators are:
 Indicator 5.7.1: Proportion of total agricultural population with ownership or secure rights over agricultural land, by sex; and (b) share of women among owners or rights-bearers of agricultural land, by type of tenure
 Indicator 5.7.2: Proportion of countries where the legal framework (including customary law) guarantees women's equal rights to land ownership and/or control

Target 5.8: Promote empowerment of women through technology 
The full title of Target 5.8 is: "Enhance the use of enabling technology, in particular information and communications technology, to promote the empowerment of women."

This target has one indicator: Indicator 5.8.1 is the "Proportion of individuals who own a mobile telephone, by sex".

A UN progress report from 2020 stated that: "Empowering women with mobile telephones has been shown to accelerate social and economic development.

There are wide gender gaps in internet access and use. Men are 21% more likely to have internet access than women, rising to 52% in the world's least developed countries. The majority of those offline are women in developing countries, reinforcing gender inequalities. Between 2013 and 2019, the gender gap in online use rose from 11% to 17%. In least-developed countries over the same period, the gap rose from 30% to 43%.

Target 5.9: Adopt and strengthen policies and enforceable legislation for gender equality 
The full title of Target 5.9 is: "Adopt and strengthen sound policies and enforceable legislation for the promotion of gender equality and the empowerment of all women and girls at all levels." 

This target has one indicator: Indicator 5.9.1 is the "Proportion of countries with systems to track and make public allocations for gender equality and women's empowerment".

Custodian agencies 
Custodian agencies are responsible for monitoring and reporting of indicators:

 Indicator 5.1.1: United Nations Women (UN Women), World Bank (WB), Organization for Economic Cooperation and Development (OECD)
 Indicator 5.2.1 and 5.2.2: United Nations Children's Emergency Fund (UNICEF), UN Women, United Nations Population Fund (UNFPA), World Health Organisation (WHO),  United Nations Office on Drugs and Crime (UNODC)
 Indicator 5.3.1 and 5.3.1: United Nations Children's Emergency Fund (UNICEF) 
 Indicator 5.4.2.: UNSD, United Nations Women (UN Women) 
 Indicator 5.5.1: IPU, United Nations Women (UN Women)  
 Indicator 5.5.2: International Labor Organization (ILO)
 Indicator 5.6.1:  and 5.6.2 is: United Nations Population Fund (UNFPA)
 Indicator 5.a.1 and  5.a.2: Food and Agriculture Organization (FAO)
 Indicator 5.a.2: Food and Agriculture Organization (FAO)
 Indicator 5.1: International Telecommunication Union (ITU)
 Indicator 5.c.2: UN Women, Organization for Economic Cooperation and Development (OECD)

Monitoring progress 
An annual report is prepared by the Secretary-General of the United Nations evaluating the progress towards the Sustainable Development Goals. This is a high-level progress reports for all the SDGs.

Challenges

Impact of COVID-19 pandemic 
The COVID-19 pandemic in 2020 also poses a challenge in achieving gender equality. The impact of COVID-19 on women have been significant for example due to compounded economic impacts, increased unpaid care work (for example during school closures), an increase in domestic violence and other factors.

Links with other SDGs 
Even though SDG 5 is a stand-alone goal, other SDGs can only be achieved if SDG 5 is achieved, i.e. the needs of women receive the same attention as the needs of men. The link between SDG 5 and the other SDGs has been extensively analysed by UN Women's report on gender equality in the 2030 agenda for sustainable development.

Organizations 

Several global organizations have vowed to achieve progress towards SDG 5 in various ways. For example:

 UN Women works for the empowerment of women.  
 Equality Now advocates for the protection and promotion of the human rights of women and girls.  
 Vital Voices works with women leaders in the areas of economic empowerment, women's political participation, and human rights. 
 UNDP works to promote women's participation and leadership in all forms of decision-making.
 UNICEF builds partnerships across the global community to accelerate gender equality.
 WHO is working for a world in which no one misses out on health services because of their gender – or for any other reason.

References

External links 

 UN Sustainable Development Knowledge Platform – SDG 5
 “Global Goals” Campaign - SDG 5
 SDG-Track.org - SDG 5
 UN SDG 5 in the US

Sustainable development
Sustainable Development Goals
United Nations documents